Gertrude Eleanor Spurr Cutts (1858–1941) was a Canadian artist.

Career
Born in Scarborough, Yorkshire, England, Gertrude Spurr began her career as an artist in England, exhibiting her work with the Royal Society of British Artists and the Society of Women Artists.

In 1890, Cutts emigrated to Canada, moving to Toronto, and opened an art studio. Cutts exhibited her work at the Palace of Fine Arts at the 1893 World's Columbian Exposition in Chicago, Illinois. In 1900, she studied at the Art Students League of New York with George Bridgman, Birge Harrison, and John F. Carlson. She married William Cutts in 1909, and the couple spent three years painting in England.

Cutts had a diverse body of work, comprising oil and watercolour paintings and pen and ink sketches; she is perhaps best known for her rural landscape paintings. She also worked as a restorer of old or damaged paintings.

Cutts' work is included in the collections of the National Gallery of Canada, the Art Gallery of Ontario, the Art Gallery of Hamilton, and the Robert McLaughlin Gallery. The Gertrude Spurr Cutts fonds is at the National Gallery of Canada Library and Archives.

She died in Port Perry, Ontario in 1941.

References

External links

Gertrude Spurr Cutts fonds at the National Gallery of Canada, Ottawa, Ontario

1858 births
1941 deaths
19th-century Canadian painters
20th-century Canadian painters
20th-century Canadian women artists
19th-century Canadian women artists
Canadian landscape painters
Artists from Yorkshire
Canadian watercolourists
Canadian women painters
Women watercolorists
British emigrants to Canada
Members of the Royal Canadian Academy of Arts